Ravin Bay is a small bay between Cape Pepin and the point where Francais Glacier discharges into the sea. Discovered in 1840 by a French expedition under Captain Jules Dumont d'Urville and named by him for the aspect of the coast, "ravin" being French for ravine.

References

Bays of Adélie Land